The Mayor of Cambridgeshire and Peterborough is a combined authority mayor, first elected in May 2017. The mayor is leader of the Cambridgeshire and Peterborough Combined Authority.

This office was created under the Cities and Local Government Devolution Act 2016 which allowed for the creation of 'Metro mayors' to lead combined authorities in England.

List of mayors

Timeline

See also
Cambridgeshire Police and Crime Commissioner

References

Cambridgeshire and Peterborough
Local government in Cambridgeshire